Heinrich Lehnert was a German fishing trawler that was built in 1918 as SMS Viceadmiral E. Schmidt for the Kaiserliche Marine. She was sold and renamed Heinrich Lennert in 1919. She was requisitioned by the Kriegsmarine in the Second World War for use as a Vorpostenboot, serving as V 314 Heinrich Lehnert and later as the Vorpostensicherungsboot Vs 314 Heinrich Lehnert. Returned to her owners post-war, she was scrapped in 1950.

Description
The engine was built by G. Seebeck AG, Wesermünde, Germany. It was rated at 63nhp. It drove a single screw propeller.

History
Viceadmiral E. Schmidt was built as yard number 109 by Schiffsbau & Maschinenfabrik Hansa AG, Tönning for the Kaiserliche Marine. She was launched in September 1918 and completed in November. She saw no active service and was sold on 24 March 1919 to Grundmann & Gröschel and was renamed Heinrich Lehnert. The fishing boat registration PG 285 was allocated, as were the Code Letters KRFP. Her port of registry was Wesermünde. In 1934, her Code Letters were changed to DEXV.

She was scheduled to have participated in Unternehmen Seelöwe in 1940. On 27 April 1941, Eifel was requisitoned by the Kriegsmarine for use as a vorpostenboot. She was allocated to 3 Vorpostenflotille as V 314 Heinrich Lehnert. On 1 October 1943, she was redesignated as a Vorpostensicherungsboot, serving as Vs 314 Heinrich Lehnert. In 1945, she was returned to her owners. The fishing boat registration BX 319 was allocated. She arrived at Leth & Co,, Hamburg for scrapping on 28 August 1950.

References

Sources

1918 ships
Ships built in Germany
Auxiliary ships of the Imperial German Navy
Fishing vessels of Germany
Steamships of Germany
Auxiliary ships of the Kriegsmarine
Steamships of West Germany
Fishing vessels of West Germany